KHMP, virtual and UHF digital channel 18, is a low-powered ESTV (Esports TV)-affiliated television station licensed to Henderson, Nevada, United States. The station is owned by DNV Spectrum Holdings, LLC.

Digital channels
The station's digital signal is multiplexed:

References

External links

HMP-LD
Henderson, Nevada
Low-power television stations in the United States
Television channels and stations established in 2002
2002 establishments in Nevada